The 2021–22 season is Hyderabad cricket team's 88th competitive season. The Hyderabad cricket team is senior men's domestic cricket team based in the city of Hyderabad, India, run by the Hyderabad Cricket Association (HCA). They represent the state of Telangana in domestic competitions.

Squad

Arrivals
Hanuma Vihari returned back to the Hyderabad squad for the first time since his departure to Andhra in 2015.

Departures
Yudhvir Singh migrated to his home state, Jammu and Kashmir.

Players
The following players made at least one appearance for Hyderabad in first-class, List A or Twenty20 cricket in 2021–22 season.  Age given is at the start of Hyderabad's first match of the season (4 November 2021).
Players with international caps are listed in bold.

Competitions

Overview

Syed Mushtaq Ali Trophy

The Syed Mushtaq Ali Trophy, a Twenty20 cricket tournament in India, fixtures were announced by the Board of Control for Cricket in India (BCCI) on 30 August 2021 and the Hyderabad was placed in the Group E with all the group fixtures to be played in a bio-secure hub in Haryana. On 23 October, the Hyderabad announced two teams for the tournament with one team being selected by the Syed Quadri's panel supported by the HCA president group while the other by Noel David's committee supported by the secretary group. The feud between the two on various issues including the team selection continued until the Supreme Court intervened to resolve the issue. The final team was confirmed on 30 October with Tanmay Agarwal as captain and Milap Mewada as coach.

The Hyderabad started their campaign on 4 November with a win against the Saurashtra. They topped their group winning all their five group matches with Agarwal and Chama Milind as leading run-getter and wicket-taker of the tournament during the group stages respectively. The Hyderabad defeated the Gujarat by 30 runs in the quarterfinal but lost to the Tamil Nadu in the semifinal.

Points table

Knockout stage

Matches
Group stage

Quarter-final

Semi-final

Vijay Hazare Trophy

The Vijay Hazare Trophy, a List A cricket tournament in India, fixtures were announced by the Board of Control for Cricket in India (BCCI) on 30 August 2021 and the Hyderabad was placed in the Group C with all the group fixtures to be played in Chandigarh. The Hyderabad announced their squad on 2 December 2021.

The Hyderabad started their campaign with the wins against Haryana and Delhi in their first two group matches. They failed to qualify for the knockout stage after losing their last three group matches thereby finishing fourth in the group stage.

Points table

Matches
Group stage

Ranji Trophy

The Ranji Trophy, a first-class cricket tournament in India, fixtures were announced by the Board of Control for Cricket in India (BCCI) on 30 August 2021 and the Hyderabad was placed in the Group C with all the group fixtures to be played at Kolkata. The Hyderabad announced their squad on 27 December 2021. The tournament was scheduled to start on 13 January 2022 but was postponed due to the rise in COVID-19 cases in India. The BCCI announced revised schedule for the tournament on 3 February 2022 with league stage to be conducted between February 10 and March 15 and knockout stage  between May 30 and June 26.

The Hyderabad started their campaign with a win against the Chandigarh but lost to Bengal in their second match. Despite winning their final group stage match against the Baroda, they missed out on qualification for the knockout stage by finishing second in their group.

Points table

Matches
Group stage

Player statistics

Batting

Bowling

Fielding

References

External links
Hyderabad cricket team official site

Cricket in Hyderabad, India
Cricket in Telangana
Sport in Telangana